Pivot Peak is a prominent conical peak, 2,470 m, distinguished by a large northeast cirque and as the highest point in Wilkniss Mountains, Victoria Land. The New Zealand Northern Survey Party of the Commonwealth Trans-Antarctic Expedition (1956–58) established a survey station on its summit on January 21, 1958. So named by them because its prominent appearance and location make it the focal point of the topography in that area.

Mountains of Victoria Land
Scott Coast